Major-General Kenneth Christie Cooper  (18 October 1905 – 4 September 1981) was a senior British Army officer who commanded 7th Armoured Division.

Military career
Educated at Berkhamsted School, Cooper was commissioned into the 53rd (Welsh) Divisional Signals Regiment in 1924 and then transferred to the Royal Tank Corps in 1927.

He served in World War II as Commanding Officer of the Fife and Forfar Yeomanry from October 1941, as a General Staff Officer with IX Corps in North Africa from 1942 and as a Brigadier on the General Staff at Allied Force Headquarters from 1943. His last war-time role was as Commander of 7th Armoured Brigade in Italy from 1945.

He was appointed Brigadier, Royal Armoured Corps at Northern Command in 1947, Chief of Staff at West Africa Command in 1948 and Assistant commandant of the Staff College, Camberley in 1952. He went on to be General Officer Commanding 7th Armoured Division in 1953 and Chief of Staff Allied Forces Northern Europe in 1956 before retiring in 1959.

He lived at West End House in Donhead St Andrew in Wiltshire.

Family
He married Barbara Mary Harding‑Newman; they had one son, Major General Sir Simon Cooper.

References

External links
Imperial War Museum Interview
Generals of World War II

1905 births
1981 deaths
British Army major generals
British Army brigadiers of World War II
Companions of the Order of the Bath
Companions of the Distinguished Service Order
Fife and Forfar Yeomanry officers
Officers of the Order of the British Empire
People educated at Berkhamsted School
Royal Tank Regiment officers
Military personnel from Cardiff
Academics of the Staff College, Camberley
Royal Corps of Signals officers
Graduates of the Staff College, Camberley